The Maldives first participated at the Olympic Games in 1988. It has sent athletes to compete in every Summer Olympic Games since, but has not participated in the Winter Olympic Games.

As of 2021, the Maldives has not won any medals at the Olympics.

The National Olympic Committee for Maldives was created in 1985 and recognized by the International Olympic Committee that same year.

Medal

Medals by Summer Games

See also 
 List of flag bearers for the Maldives at the Olympics
 :Category:Olympic competitors for the Maldives

External links

 
 
 

 
Olympics